Jim Croce was an American singer-songwriter with five studio albums and 12 singles to his credit. His posthumously-released fifth studio album was completed just prior to his 1973 death, and seven singles were also posthumously issued, one of which was "Time in a Bottle" from a previous album You Don't Mess Around with Jim. His popularity continued long after his death with the release of numerous compilation albums and "new" material (from the vaults) being portioned out sporadically over the years. Three live albums, as well as a live DVD, have also been published.

Croce's first two studio albums Facets and Croce (aka Jim & Ingrid Croce) did not chart, but his third, You Don't Mess Around with Jim, peaked at No. 1 on the Billboard 200 following his death. This album featured three singles, "You Don't Mess Around with Jim", "Operator (That's Not the Way It Feels)", and "Time in a Bottle". His fourth album Life and Times peaked at No. 2 in the United States, but reached No. 1 in Canada in late December 1973. It featured the singles "One Less Set of Footsteps", "Bad, Bad Leroy Brown", and "It Doesn't Have to Be That Way".

"Bad, Bad Leroy Brown" achieved great success, reaching the No. 1 position on the Billboard Hot 100. "Time in a Bottle" went from a relatively unknown album cut to a posthumous No. 1 after the boost it received from being featured in the ABC TV-movie She Lives. His fifth album, I Got a Name, was released in December 1973 and reached the No. 2 position in both the United States and Canada. This album would feature the title song "I Got a Name", "I'll Have to Say I Love You in a Song", and "Workin' at the Car Wash Blues". The song, "I Got a Name" had been released as a single during Croce's lifetime, but "I'll Have to Say I Love You in a Song" became a posthumous number one release when it reached the top position on Billboard Adult Contemporary Singles in 1974.

Several compilation albums such as Down the Highway and The Faces I've Been were released in the mid 1970s, the latter containing unissued and demo recordings from an unreleased album. Two songs from "The Faces I've Been" were released as singles, "Chain Gang Medley" and "Mississippi Lady". They would be his final singles released. Another compilation album, Photographs & Memories became a successful release by reaching No. 1 on the Canadian charts and No. 2 on the Billboard 200 in the United States. It also achieved a platinum certification in the United States, and a Gold certification in Hong Kong.

Even after his death, his popularity continued and a demand for unreleased material caused a live album to be released, Jim Croce Live: The Final Tour. It was recorded during the summer of 1973. More demo recordings were released in 2003 on the album Home Recordings: Americana. A DVD featuring live concert footage was also released in 2003, Have You Heard: Jim Croce Live which later spawned a CD featuring the audio from the concert footage.

Studio albums

Live albums

Compilation albums

Singles

BPeaked at 10 on Bubbling Under Hot 100 Singles.

Videography

DVDs

Music videos

Tribute albums
The Ventures: The Ventures Play the Jim Croce Songbook (1974)
Jerry Reed: Jerry Reed Sings Jim Croce" (1980)
Various Artists: Jim Croce: A Nashville Tribute'' (1997)

Notes

A  "Lover's Cross" was only released as a single in the United Kingdom.

References

External links
 

Folk music discographies
Discographies of American artists
Pop music discographies
Rock music discographies